John Birkett may refer to:
 John Birkett (rugby union), English rugby union player
 John Birkett (surgeon), English surgeon

See also
 John Burkett, American baseball pitcher